Ioane Minchkhi was a 10th-century Georgian hymnographer, contemporary to the king George II of Abkhazia. He is considered as author of the whole Sticheron part of the first Georgian “Lenten Triodion”. Ioane Minchkhi lived and worked at Mount Sinai. This explains the fact that a considerable part of his hymns are preserved in Sinaitic manuscripts. Ioane Minchkhi's four hymns are included in Iadgari of Mikael Modrekili (Tropologion) (978-988).

His name has become known in academic circles thanks to Ivane Javakhishvili, who discovered the hymns of this unknown Georgian hymnist in Georgian manuscripts during his academic trip to Mount Sinai in 1902. This was a hymnographical Canon devoted to St. George and 26 small-sized hymns.

References

External links
Towards the Earliest Redaction of the “Triodion”

Members of the Georgian Orthodox Church
Male writers from Georgia (country)
10th-century people from Georgia (country)
Hymnwriters from Georgia (country)